Heterocallia is a genus of moths in the family Geometridae erected by John Henry Leech in 1897. It is sometimes listed as a synonym of Oxymacaria.

Selected species
Heterocallia deformis Inoue, 1986
Heterocallia truncaria Leech, 1897

References

Macariini